The following is a list of dams in Aichi Prefecture, Japan.

List

See also

References 

Aichi